William McCormick may refer to:
 William McCormick (diplomat) (born 1939), American diplomat
 William McCormick (businessman) (1742–1815), Scottish-born merchant in North Carolina
 William McCormick (Upper Canada politician) (1784–1840), Canadian businessman, author and politician
 William McCormick (MP) (1801–1878), Conservative Londonderry City MP
 William E. McCormick (1831–1900), American lawyer, businessman, and politician from New York
 William Grigsby McCormick (1851–1941), American businessman
 William Sanderson McCormick (1815–1865), businessman from Virginia operated reaper business in Chicago
 William Symington McCormick (1859–1930), Scottish-born scholar and educational administrator
 Barry McCormick (William Joseph McCormick, 1874–1956), American baseball player
 Bill McCormick (Canadian football) (born c. 1928), Canadian football player
 Fergie McCormick (William Fergus McCormick, 1939–2018), New Zealand rugby player
 William McCormick (doctor), operated a sanatorium on Toronto's Wendigo Creek

See also
 William M. Blair (William McCormick Blair, 1884–1982), American financier
 William McCormick Blair Jr. (1916–2015), American diplomat
 William McCormack (disambiguation)